Since the inception of the EFL Championship, England's current second tier, in 2004, there have been 61 stadiums used in the League. Following the Hillsborough Disaster in 1989, the Taylor Report recommended the abolition of standing terraces by the start of the 1994–95 season, to be replaced by all-seater stadiums. Certain grounds have had terracing in recent years.

Stadiums
Those marked in bold indicate teams playing in the 2022-23 season, while those in italics have been demolished.

References 

C
stadiums